{{Taxobox
| name = Longzhua
| fossil_range = 
| regnum = Animalia
| phylum = Arthropoda
| classis = Insecta
| superordo = Archaeorthoptera
| familia = incertae sedis
| genus = Longzhua
| genus_authority = Gu, Béthoux & Ren, 2011
| species = L. loculata| binomial = Longzhua loculata| binomial_authority = Gu, Béthoux & Ren, 2011
}}Longzhua loculata''' is an extinct archaeorthopteran (stem group Orthoptera) species which existed in what is now China during the Pennsylvanian period. Fossils of the genus were found in the Yanghugou Formation.

References

Pennsylvanian insects
Prehistoric insect genera
Insect enigmatic taxa
Gzhelian life
Kasimovian life
Carboniferous animals of Asia
Paleozoic insects of Asia
Carboniferous China
Fossils of China
Fossil taxa described in 2011